The House of Fabergé (Russian: Дом Фаберже) was a jewellery firm founded in 1842 in Saint Petersburg, Russia, by Gustav Faberge, using the accented name Fabergé. Gustav's sons – Peter Carl and Agathon – and grandsons followed him in running the business until it was nationalised by the Bolsheviks in 1918. The firm was famous for designing elaborate jewel-encrusted Fabergé eggs for the Russian Tsars, and for a range of other work of high quality and intricate detail. In 1924, Peter Carl's sons Alexander and Eugène Fabergé opened a firm called Fabergé & Cie in Paris, France, making similar jewellery items and adding the name of the city to their firm's stamp, styling it FABERGÉ, PARIS.

In 1951, rights to the Fabergé brand name for the marketing of perfume were bought by Samuel Rubin. In 1964, Rubin sold his Fabergé Inc. company to cosmetics firm Rayette Inc., which changed its name to Rayette-Fabergé Inc. As the brand was resold more times, companies using the Fabergé name launched clothing lines, the cologne Brut (which became the best-selling cologne at the time), the perfume Babe, hair products, and also undertook film production. The brand changed hands additional times, and jewellery was eventually added back to the product lines. Next to branded Fabergé items, the world market has been continuously supplied with imitation "Fauxbergé" objects and "Fabergé-style" products. Today, the brand is owned by a company called Fabergé Limited and is used solely for jewellery items and gem stones.

Early years

The Fabergé family's origins can be traced back to 17th-century France, under the name Favri. The Favris lived at the village of La Bouteille in the Picardy region of northern France. However, they fled the country during or shortly after 1685 because of religious persecution following the Revocation of the Edict of Nantes. An estimated 250,000 fellow Huguenots, as the movement of French Protestants was known, became refugees.

During the family's progress eastward through Europe, its name changed progressively from Favri through Favry, Fabri, Fabrier, Faberges and then to Faberge without an accent. At Schwedt-on-Oder northeast of Berlin, in the second half of the 18th century, a Jean Favri (subsequently Favry) is known to have been employed as a tobacco planter. By 1800, an artisan called Pierre Favry (later Peter Fabrier) had settled in Pärnu, in the Baltic province of Livonia (now Estonia). A Gustav Fabrier was born there in 1814. By 1825, the family's name had evolved to "Faberge".

In the 1830s, Gustav Faberge moved to Saint Petersburg to train as a goldsmith under Andreas Ferdinand Spiegel, who specialised in making gold boxes. Later, he continued his training with the celebrated firm of Keibel, goldsmiths and jewellers to the Tsars. In 1841, his apprenticeship over, Gustav Faberge earned the title of Master Goldsmith.

Launch
In 1842, Gustav Faberge opened a shop named Fabergé as a jewellery store in a basement. Adding a diacritic to the name's final e may have been an attempt to give the name a more explicitly French character, to appeal to the Russian nobility's Francophilia. French was the official language of Russia's royal court, it was widely used by the country's aristocracy, and Russia's upper classes associated France with luxury goods.

Later that year, Gustav married Charlotte Jungstedt, the daughter of Carl Jungstedt, an artist of Danish origin. In 1846, the couple had a son, Peter Carl Fabergé, popularly known as Carl Fabergé.

Carl Fabergé

Carl Fabergé was educated at the Gymnasium of St Anne's. This was a fashionable establishment for the sons of the affluent middle classes and the lower echelons of the nobility, providing an indication of the success of his father's business. Gustav Fabergé retired to Dresden in 1860, leaving the firm in the hands of managers outside of the Fabergé family while his son continued his education. The young Carl undertook a business course at the Dresden Handelsschule. At the age of 18, he embarked on a Grand Tour. He received tuition from respected goldsmiths in Frankfurt, France and England, attended a course at Schloss's Commercial College in Paris and viewed the objects in the galleries of Europe's leading museums.

Carl returned to Saint Petersburg in 1872, aged 26 years. For the following ten years, his father's workmaster, Hiskias Pendin, acted as his mentor and tutor. In 1881, the firm moved to larger street-level premises at 16/18 Bolshaia Morskaia. Following Pendin's death in 1882, Carl took over the running of the firm. Three other significant events happened that year. He was awarded the title of Master Goldsmith. Agathon Fabergé, his younger brother by 16 years, joined the business. While Agathon's education was restricted to Dresden, he was noted as a talented designer who provided the business with fresh impetus, until his death 13 years later.

Rise to prominence
Following Carl's involvement with repairing and restoring objects in the Hermitage Museum, the firm was invited to exhibit at the Pan-Russian Exhibition in Moscow. One of the Fabergé pieces displayed at the exhibition was a replica of a 4th-century BC gold bangle from the Scythian Treasure in the Hermitage Museum. Tsar Alexander III declared that he could not distinguish Fabergé's work from the original. He ordered that specimens of work by the House of Fabergé should be displayed in the Hermitage Museum as examples of superb contemporary Russian craftsmanship. In 1885, the House of Fabergé was bestowed with the coveted title "Goldsmith by special appointment to the Imperial Crown", beginning an association with the Russian tsars.

The Imperial Easter eggs

In 1885, Tsar Alexander III commissioned the House of Fabergé to make an Easter egg as a gift for his wife, the Empress Maria Feodorovna. Its "shell" is enamelled on gold to represent a normal hen's egg. This pulls apart to reveal a gold yolk, which in turn opens to produce a gold chicken that also opens to reveal a replica of the Imperial Crown from which a miniature ruby egg was suspended. Although the Crown and the miniature egg have been lost, the rest of the Hen Egg as it is known is now in the collection of Victor Vekselberg.

The tradition of the Tsar giving his Empress a surprise Easter egg by Carl Fabergé continued. From 1887, it appears that Carl Fabergé was given complete freedom as to the design of the Imperial Easter eggs as they became more elaborate. According to the Fabergé Family tradition, not even the Tsar knew what egg form they would take: the only stipulation was that each one should contain a surprise. The House of Fabergé completed 50 Imperial eggs for Alexander III to present to his Empress and for Nicholas II to present to his mother, the Dowager Empress Maria Feodorovna and his wife the Empress Alexandra Feodorovna. Of these, 43 are known to have survived.

Hardstone sculptures

Amongst Fabergé's more popular creations were the miniature hardstone carvings of people, animals and flowers carved from semi-precious or hardstones and embellished with precious metals and stones. The most common animal carvings were elephants and pigs but included custom made miniatures of pets of the British Royal family and other notables. The flower sculptures were complete figural tableaus, which included small vases in which carved flowers were permanently set, the vase and "water" were done in clear rock crystal (quartz) and the flowers in various hardstones and enamel. The figures were typically only 25–75 mm long or wide, with some larger and more rare figurines reaching 140–200 mm tall, and were collected throughout the world; the British Royal family has over 250 items in the Royal Collection, including pieces made by Michael Perkhin and Henrik Wigström. Other important Fabergé miniature collectors were Marjorie Merriweather Post, her niece Barbara Hutton and even Fabergé's competitor Cartier, who in 1910 purchased a pink jade pig and a carnelian (agate) fox with cabochon ruby eyes set in gold.

Other Fabergé creations
The House of Fabergé also stocked a full range of jewellery and other ornamental objects. There were enamelled gold and silver gilt, as well as wooden photograph frames; gold and silver boxes; desk sets, walking sticks, doorbells and timepieces. Quality was assured by every article made being approved by Carl Fabergé, or in his absence by his eldest son Eugène, before it was placed into stock. The minutest of faults would result in rejection.

Continued expansion
The House of Fabergé won international awards and became Russia's largest jewellery firm employing some 500 craftsmen and designers. In the early 20th century, the headquarters of the House of Fabergé moved to a purpose-built, four-storey building in Bolshaia Morskaia. Branches were also opened in Moscow, Odessa, Kiev and London. From England, the company made annual visits to the Far East.

After the Revolution
The House of Fabergé was nationalised by the Bolsheviks in 1918. In early October, Carl Fabergé left Petrograd on the last diplomatic train for Riga. The revolution in Latvia started in the middle of the following month, and Carl was again fleeing for his life to Germany, first to Bad Homburg and then to Wiesbaden. The Bolsheviks imprisoned his sons Agathon and Alexander. Initially, Agathon was released to value the treasures seized from the imperial family, the aristocrats, wealthy merchants and Fabergé, amongst other jewellers. He was again imprisoned when the Bolsheviks found it difficult to sell this treasure at Agathon's valuations. With Europe awash with Russian jewels, prices had fallen. Madame Fabergé and her eldest son, Eugène, avoided capture by escaping under the cover of darkness through the snow-covered woods by sleigh and on foot. Towards the end of December 1918, they had crossed the border into the safety of Finland.

Meanwhile in Germany, Carl Fabergé became seriously ill. Eugène reached Wiesbaden in June 1920 and accompanied his father to Switzerland, where other members of the family had taken refuge. Carl Fabergé died in Lausanne on 24 September 1920. His wife died in January 1925. Although Alexander managed to escape from prison when a friend bribed guards, Agathon did not succeed in making his escape from the USSR until November 1927 when he, his wife Maria and son Oleg, together with four helpers, escaped by sleigh under cover of darkness across the frozen Gulf of Finland. Agathon and his family spent the rest of their lives in Finland.

Fabergé & Cie
In 1924, Alexander and Eugène opened Fabergé & Cie in Paris, where they had a modest success making the types of items that their father retailed years before. To distinguish their pieces from those made in Russia before the Revolution, they used the trademark FABERGÉ, PARIS, whereas the Russian company's trademark was just FABERGÉ. They also sold jewellery and had a sideline repairing and restoring the items that had been made by the original House of Fabergé.

Fabergé & Cie lost a legal case in Hong Kong in 1984, in a dispute with Fabergé Inc. over trademark rights in the use of the name 'Fabergé' for jewellery. Fabergé & Cie continued to operate in Paris until 2001.

Reputation
The reputation of Fabergé as a producer of the highest standard was maintained by publications and major exhibitions, such as those at the Victoria & Albert Museum in 1994 and the Royal Collection in 2003–4.

Following the end of the Soviet Union and the rise of the oligarchs, Russian collectors sought to repatriate many of Fabergé's works, and auction prices reached record highs. On 27 November 2007, the Rothschild Fabergé Egg was auctioned at Christie's in London for £8.98 million. The Rothschild Fabergé egg became the record price for a piece of Fabergé, as well as the highest price ever paid for a Russian object and the most expensive price for a timepiece.

Many celebrities and billionaires collect Fabergé pieces, Joan Rivers, estate sold $2.2 million worth of Fabergé at auction.

Sale of brand name

During the course of business ventures in communist Russia during the 1920s, American oil tycoon Armand Hammer acquired many objects made by the original House of Fabergé, including Fabergé eggs. In 1937, Hammer's friend Samuel Rubin, owner of the Spanish Trading Corporation (which imported soap and olive oil), closed down his company because of the Spanish Civil War and established a new enterprise to manufacture perfumes and toiletries. Rubin registered his new firm in 1937 as Fabergé Inc., at Hammer's suggestion. In 1943, Rubin registered the Fabergé trademark for perfume in the United States.

In 1945, the Fabergé family discovered that their name was being used to sell perfumes without their consent. A lengthy exchange between lawyers on both sides of the Atlantic ensued. In 1946, Rubin registered the Fabergé trademark for jewellery in the United States. An agreement was reached out of court in 1951 with the Fabergé family, whereby Rubin agreed to pay Fabergé & Cie the amount of US$25,000 (equal to $ today) to use the Fabergé name solely in relation to perfume.

In 1964, Rubin sold Fabergé Inc. for $26 million to George Barrie and the Rayette Inc. cosmetics company. Rayette changed its name in 1964 to Rayette-Fabergé Inc., then in 1971, the company name was changed again to Fabergé Inc. In 1978, Michael J. Stiker filed for the patent rights for Fabergé jewellery in New York on behalf of Fabergé & Cie in Paris, but this attempt to license the jewellery brand failed.

From 1964 to 1984, under the direction of Barrie, many well-known and successful product lines (as well as feature movies) were launched by Fabergé Inc. Barrie supervised the introduction of the Brut toiletry line for Fabergé, which was promoted by football player Joe Namath. In 1977, he signed Farrah Fawcett to a promotional contract with Fabergé for the Farrah Fawcett hair product and fragrance lines. A famous Fabergé TV ad featured Joe Namath being shaved by Farrah Fawcett. Brut became the best-selling cologne in the world at that time, and it remains available today worldwide.

In 1967, film actor and businessman Cary Grant was appointed Creative Consultant and, in 1968, a member of the Board of Directors of the company. Actor Roger Moore became a board member in 1970. Barrie established Fabergé's film-making division, Brut Productions, in 1970 and put together the Academy Award-winning movie titled A Touch of Class in 1973, and other feature movies.

Barrie launched the Babe fragrance in 1976, which in its first year became Fabergé's largest-selling women's fragrance worldwide. Actress and model Margaux Hemingway received a $1 million contract to promote the perfume Babe by Fabergé in an advertising campaign, making her the first super model. Babe received two awards from the Fragrance Foundation for its launch – Most Successful Introduction of a Women's Fragrance in Popular Distribution, and Best Advertising Campaign for Women's Fragrance.

By 1984, the company had expanded its personal care products to Aphrodisia, Aqua Net Hair Spray, Babe, Cavale, Brut, Ceramic Nail glaze, Flambeau, Great Skin, Grande Finale, Just Wonderful, Macho, Kiku, Partage, Tip Top Accessories, Tigress, Woodhue, Xandu, Zizanie de Fragonard, Caryl Richards, Farrah Fawcett and Fabergé Organics. The company also bought other firms and products, including D-LANZ and BreastCare, a breast cancer screening device.

In 1984, Israeli financier Meshulam Riklis' privately owned Riklis Family Corporation acquired Fabergé for $670 million. Many Fabergé products, including the original breast device D-LANZ, were discontinued. The company launched McGregor by Fabergé cologne the same year. New product lines were introduced, including men's, women's and children's apparel under the trademarks Billy the Kid, Scoreboard and Wonderknit.

In 1986, Mark Goldston was named President of Fabergé. He was principally responsible for targeting and acquiring the Elizabeth Arden company from Eli Lilly and Company for $725 million in 1986, turning Fabergé into a $1.2 billion firm.

Unilever
In 1989, an American subsidiary of Unilever bought Fabergé Inc. (along with Elizabeth Arden) for US$1.55 billion. The company was renamed "Elida Fabergé". The deal now placed Unilever at equal first place with L'Oreal in the world cosmetics league, up from fourth place.

Unilever registered the Fabergé name as a trademark across a wide range of merchandise internationally. It granted licenses to third parties to make and sell a range of products ranging from custom jewelry to spectacles under the Fabergé name. However, it also continued to sell perfume and toiletries branded Fabergé. 

In pop culture, the name Fabergé became synonymous with the ultimate in luxury when the Forbes family's Fabergé collection became widely publicised in the mid 1980s.

In 1989, the German jewelry manufacture company Victor Mayer was given the exclusive licensing rights to produce heirloom quality Fabergé Eggs, jewelry and watches in 18KT gold and platinum with gem stones, vitreous enamel and diamonds. In collaboration with Fabergé expert Géza von Habsburg new designs for eggs and jewelry were marketed worldwide with great success and many large Fabergé eggs are now in collections and museums. The first contemporary Fabergé jewelry and egg collection was presented to the alleged heir to the Russian crown, Grand Duke Vladimir Kirillovich of Russia, in Munich, Germany in 1991. The license with the Victor Mayer company ended in 2009 for jewelry and in 2012 for watches. From 1989 to 2001, Unilever granted further licenses for Fabergé products to Limoges and The Franklin Mint for perfumes, dolls and other items. All licensed products of the time have ten identical trademarks or stamps, a Russian eagle with the words below: "Fabergé Paris - London - New York".

Lever Fabergé was formed in the UK early in 2001, through the merger of two long-established Unilever companies, Lever Brothers and Elida Fabergé. The new company Lever Fabergé owned hundreds of cosmetics, household and other brands, including Dove, Impulse, Sure, Lynx, Organics, Timotei, Signal, Persil, Comfort, Domestos, Surf, Sun, and Cif. This meant that the Lever Fabergé name appeared on a range of household products, from bleach to toiletries.

In a complicated series of events of personal and professional vendettas between the Russian oligarch and Fabergé egg collector Viktor Vekselberg and his business partner Brian Gilbertson (the former CEO of Vekselberg's Siberian Urals Aluminium Company, or SUAL), the Fabergé brand changed hands several times. Gilbertson (who received a controversial package worth up to $38 million when he resigned from BHP-Billiton in 2003 after just six months as CEO) and Vekselberg had discussed starting an investment business together after Gilbertson was appointed CEO of SUAL. They set up an initial investment joint venture – a complex Cayman Islands structure to be funded by Renova Group and managed by Gilbertson. However, the plan went awry in 2006, as the joint venture negotiated to buy the Fabergé brand name from Unilever. Vekselberg (a connoisseur of Fabergé Imperial eggs who owns nine of the jewel-encrusted creations, having acquired the Forbes family collection in 2004 for a reported US$100 million) insisted that one of his personal companies (as opposed to the joint venture) get title to the brand, although the benefits of reviving the brand would stay within the joint venture fund. In 2004, Vekselberg had purchased the largest Fabergé collection in existence from the Forbes family (for 50 million pounds) shortly before it was to be sold at auction, leaving him with the largest Fabergé jewelry collection but not with the Fabergé brand name.

Fabergé Limited
On 3 January 2007, Pallinghurst Resources (now Gemfields), an investment advisory firm based in London and of which Gilbertson was a partner, announced that a Pallinghurst portfolio company had acquired Unilever's entire global portfolio of trademarks, licenses and associated rights relating to the Fabergé brand name for a mere $38 million. The trademarks, licenses and associated rights were acquired by a newly constituted company, Fabergé Limited, which was registered in the Cayman Islands.

In October 2007, it was announced that the company intended to restore Fabergé to its position as the leading purveyor of enduring and endearing personal possessions. Furthermore, it announced the reunification of the Fabergé brand and the Fabergé family, with Tatiana Fabergé and Sarah Fabergé (both great-granddaughters of Peter Carl Fabergé) becoming founding members of the Fabergé Heritage Council, a division of Fabergé Limited which was to offer counsel to the new company.

In September 2009, Fabergé Limited launched its first collection of high jewellery, as well as its website. In December of that year, it opened a boutique in Geneva. By March 2010, only one of the licenses originally granted by Unilever remained in existence. On 6 July 2011, the company launched two collections of egg pendants, including a dozen high jewellery egg pendants. These were the first to have been made by a Fabergé reunited with the family since 1917. In November 2011, Fabergé items were being sold in the Fine Jewellery Room at Harrods in London's Knightsbridge, and later in the month, Fabergé opened its own boutique on Grafton Street in the heart of London's Mayfair area. In May 2012, Fabergé opened its own boutique on New York's Madison Avenue.

In 2012, Gilbertson and a related trust on the one hand, Renova Group, Vekselberg and Vladimir Kutnetsov met in court in the Cayman Islands over the original acquisition of the Fabergé brand name from Unilever. The claim of Vekselberg to get damages from Gilbertson (he made no claim over rights to the trademark) was dismissed in court. The judge called the lawsuit a personal fight between Gilbertson and Vekselberg. Vekselberg appealed the court's decision, and the verdict is awaited.

In January 2013, Fabergé Limited was sold to the gem mining company Gemfields for 142 million new shares in Gemfields plc, with a value of $90 million at completion of the transaction. After the transaction, Gilbertson, Pallinghurst and its co-investors held some 74% of Gemfields.

Accounts filed with Companies House in the UK on 25 October 2015 show that Fabergé (UK) Limited, the principal trading entity, lost £0.525 million for the year ending 30 June 2015. The accounts reveal that a significant spend in research and development was made during the year in respect of the new timepiece collections. These were successfully launched during the year. Indeed, in November 2015, Fabergé won a coveted Grand Prix d'Horlogerie de Genève award – the 'Ladies Hi Mechanical' prize.

In 2017, the Head Office of Fabergé jewelry brand (which is located in London) noticed Mariana Voinova in the photographic project for L'Officiel Ukraine. Mariana was invited as ambassador to the Jewelry House in the spring of the same year and discharges her duties up to now. Mariana Voinova acts as the collection face, the ideological inspirational figure of the shooting, and the producer.

On October 3, 2017, the Jewelry House Fabergé unveiled both the male and female lines in its advertising campaign. Filip Wolfe, the famous Swedish mannequin, was the face of the men's collection of the brand, and Mariana Voinova represented the women's collection. The shooting took place in London.

In 2020, Fabergé created The Emerald Isle Collection with The Craft Irish Whiskey Co, a collection of jewelry and luxury items. Workmaster Marcus Mohr of Victor Mayer created a unique 'Fabergé Egg' for the collection. The value of the collection is 2 million dollars.

Museum
In 2009, a Fabergé museum was opened by Alexander Ivanov in Baden-Baden, formerly a spa destination for 19th-century Russian aristocrats. It houses a very large collection of some 1,500 items including the Karelian Birch egg, made exclusively in 1917 for Tsar Nicholas II of Russia. The museum also owns one of the Constellation eggs, which Ivanov claims is the original finished piece, also purchased by the Tsar as an easter gift for his wife Alexandra Feodorovna (Alix of Hesse).

In popular culture
In the 1983 James Bond movie Octopussy a Fabergé Egg is the central object of the plot. Malcolm Forbes stirred the imagination of his contemporaries in the 1980s with his riches by widely publicising his Fabergé collection, making the term Fabergé egg synonymous with extreme wealth and luxury. In the 2004 movie Ocean's 12, Danny Ocean (George Clooney) and crew compete with another thief to steal a Fabergé Egg from a European museum

In 2015 a restaurant in Brooklyn was sued by Faberge Inc. over the use of the brand name.
The American television personality Joan Rivers famously collected Fabergé jewelry and marketed copies of her Fabergé pieces on her television show. From 1990 to 2014 she appeared on the show Joan Rivers Classics Collection on QVC. In 1995 she published a best selling book Jewelry by Joan Rivers, which shows original Fabergé jewelry and her copies for QVC. This kind of similar but not actual Fabergé jewelry was coined by Fabergé specialist Geza von Habsburg as Fauxbergé, a play on words with the french word faux for false or faked and Fabergé. The category Fauxbergé might relate to all objects created starting at the time of the company founder Carl Fabergé till the present time. In 2000 Unilever gave the Fabergé license to Mattel for a Barbie collection.

In The Simpsons episode 'Round Springfield", it is revealed that the character Bleeding Gums Murphy spent all of his money on a "$1500 a day habit" by buying several Fabergé eggs a day.

In 2014 the Las Vegas hotel Bellagio hosted an extensive Fauxbergé exhibition.

Gustav Fabergé monument 
Gustav Fabergé monument was opened in Pärnu on 3 January 2015 in the year of the bicentenary of his birth. The bronze statue is a gift to the city from Alexander Tenzo, the founder of TENZO jewellery house. Composition authors Alexander Tenzo and Vladislav Yakovsky. Sculptor Eugeny Burkov. The statue was mounted with support of the City Government of Pärnu and Pärnu Fabergé Society represented by Tiina Ojaste and Toomas Kuter.

See also
Fabergé egg
List of Fabergé workmasters
Fauxbergé

References

Further reading

External links

  – about the original House of Fabergé and its work
  – the current jewellery company

Fabergé
Hardstone carving
Vitreous enamel
Design companies established in 1842
Companies nationalised by the Soviet Union